The Sudoeste Festival, currently named MEO Sudoeste for sponsorship reasons, is a music festival that takes places annually since 1997, in August, in Odemira, in the southwest of Portugal. It is organized by live entertainment company Música no Coração and is currently sponsored by the Portuguese telecommunications company MEO.

The festival started as a rock festival. Over the years, it has featured a considerable variety of headliners, such as Marylin Manson, Blur, Sonic Youth, The Cure, UB40, Massive Attack, Kraftwerk, Oasis, Daft Punk, Björk, Faith No More, Snoop Dogg and Kanye West. It had a stage dedicated to reggae music from 2005 to 2013. In the early 2010s, it gradually changed its musical focus to mainly hip-hop, mainstream pop and electronic dance music.

Editions

1997 
The first edition of the Sudoeste Festival happened on 8, 9 and 10 August 1997. Its main sponsor was Sagres beer.

1998 
The second edition took place on 7, 8 and 9 August 1998. The main sponsor was Sagres.

1999 
The third edition took place on 6, 7 and 8 August 1999. The main sponsor was Sagres.

2000 
The fourth edition took place on 4, 5 and 6 August 2000. The main sponsor was Sagres.

2001 
The fifth edition was the first with a duration of 4 days, taking place between 2 and 5 August 2001. The main sponsor was Sagres.

2002 
The sixth edition took place between 1 and 4 August 2002. The main sponsor was Sagres beer.

2003 
The seventh edition took place between 7 and 10 August 2003. The main sponsor was Optimus.

2004 
The eighth edition took place between 5 and 8 August 2004. The main sponsor was Optimus.

2005 
The ninth edition took place between 4 and 7 August 2005. The main sponsor was TMN.

2006 
The tenth edition was held between 3 and 6 August 2006. The main sponsor was TMN.

2007 
The 11th edition was held between 2 and 5 August 2007. The main sponsor was TMN.

2008 
The 12th edition was held between 6 and 10 August 2008. The main sponsor was TMN.

2009 
The 13th edition was held between 6 and 9 August 2009. The main sponsor was TMN.

2010 
The 14th edition was held between 4 and 8 August 2010. The main sponsor was TMN.

2011 
The 15th edition was held between 3 and 7 August 2011. The main sponsor was TMN.

2012 
The 16th edition was held between 1 and 5 August 2012. The main sponsor was TMN.

2013 
The 17th edition was held between 7 and 11 August 2013. The main sponsor was MEO.

2014 
The 18th edition was held between 6 and 10 August 2014. The main sponsor was MEO.

2015 
The 19th edition was held between 5 and 9 August 2015. The main sponsor was MEO.

2016 
The 20th edition was held between 3 and 7 August 2016. The main sponsor was MEO.

2017 
The 21st edition was held between 1 and 5 August 2017. The main sponsor was MEO.

2018 
The 22nd edition was held between 8 and 11 August 2018. The main sponsor was MEO.

On 9 August, Wet Bed Gang and KURA replaced Hardwell, which cancelled his performance due to sickness.

2019 
The 23rd edition was held between 7 and 10 August 2019. The main sponsor was MEO.

References

External links
 Official website
 Música no Coração official website

Music festivals in Portugal
Culture in Odemira
Music festivals established in 1997
Tourist attractions in Beja District
Electronic music festivals in Portugal
1997 establishments in Portugal
Annual events in Portugal
Summer events in Portugal